PMP may refer to:

Biology and chemistry
 Plant-made pharmaceuticals or Pharming
 p-Methoxyphenyl, a protecting group for amines
 Polymethylpentene, a type of plastic

Medicine
 Prescription monitoring program
 Pseudomyxoma peritonei, a cancer

Business
 Denel PMP, company division
 Project Management Professional, a certification

Technology
 NAT-PMP, NAT Port Mapping Protocol
 Pic Micro Pascal, Pascal compiler for PICs
 Point-to-multipoint communication, in telecommunications 
 Portable media player, for digital media

Politics
 Parliamentary Monarchist Party, Burundi
 People's Monarchist Party (Italy)
 People's Movement Party, Romania
 Pwersa ng Masang Pilipino, Philippines

Transport
 Plumpton railway station, a railway station in Sussex, England

Other uses
 Perlman Music Program, Shelter Island, New York, US
 PMP Floating Bridge, a Soviet mobile pontoon bridge
 Pompano Beach Airpark, IATA and FAA codes
 Proto-Malayo-Polynesian language
 Pontryagin's maximum principle, in mathematics